Marco Riemer (born 24 February 1988) is a German football midfielder who plays for FC Einheit Rudolstadt.
He played in the 2. Bundesliga for Carl Zeiss Jena.

References

External links
  
 

1988 births
People from Apolda
Footballers from Thuringia
Living people
German footballers
Association football midfielders
FC Carl Zeiss Jena players
SC Preußen Münster players
FC Einheit Rudolstadt players
2. Bundesliga players
3. Liga players
Regionalliga players
Oberliga (football) players